Melanorlopteryx is a genus of parasitic flies in the family Tachinidae.

Species
Melanorlopteryx costalis Townsend, 1927

Distribution
Peru

References

Diptera of South America
Exoristinae
Tachinidae genera
Taxa named by Charles Henry Tyler Townsend